James Peterson McInerney (March 24, 1859 – August 8, 1912) was a Canadian politician. He served in the Legislative Assembly of New Brunswick from 1908 to 1912 as an independent member.

References 

1859 births
1912 deaths